Marius Ugo Russo (July 19, 1914 – March 26, 2005) was a starting pitcher in Major League Baseball who played for the New York Yankees (1939–43, 1946). Russo batted right-handed and threw left-handed.

Profile
Marius Russo was born July 19, 1914 in Brooklyn, New York to Giovanni "John" Russo and Sabina Caolo, both immigrants from Italy. His father was a tailor and his family lived in Queens.

On June 6, 1939, Russo debuted with the New York Yankees. He gave four years of good services for his team, winning 14 games in both 1940 and 1941, and was their best pitcher in 1941. Beside this, he made two postseason starts in the 1941 and 1943 World Series, both complete game wins. He joined the army in 1944, and pitched briefly in 1946.

Career
Russo, known as "The Kid From LI", was born in Brooklyn, New York. He played baseball for Richmond Hill High School in Queens. Later, he attended Brooklyn College and Long Island University in Brooklyn.

After graduating, Russo played for the Newark Bears, International League farm team of the Yankees. In his rookie season for New York, he finished with an 8–3 record and a 2.41 ERA in 116.0 innings including two shutouts and nine complete games. A noted control ace, in 1940 Russo issued just 55 walks in 189.1 innings for a 2.61 W 9/I percentage while compiling a 14–8 mark with a 3.28 ERA and 15 complete games in 24 starts.
After he retired. he moved with his wife Stasia to Florida.

Russo enjoyed a career year in 1941. He compiled a 14–10 mark with three shutouts and 27 complete games in 1941. His 3.09 ERA was the best of the Yankees pitching staff and the 4th best in the American League, being surpassed only by Thornton Lee (2.37), Al Benton (2.97) and Charlie Wagner (3.07). He also led his team in strikeouts (105), games started (27), complete games (17) and innings pitched (209.2), and finished second in victories (14) behind Lefty Gomez and Red Ruffing (15 each). In the same season, he pitched a one-hit  shutout and made the AL All-Star team.

Russo also started and won a complete game 2–1 victory in the Yankees 1941 World Series win over the Brooklyn Dodgers.

A sore arm limited Russo to pitch only  innings in 1942, ending the season with a 4–1 record and a 2.78 ERA in nine games (five as a starter). In 1943, he never had control problems, his arm was not hurting, but his fastball was losing velocity while trying to simplify his delivery, and finished 5–10. The Yankees provided him with 3.50 runs per game in offense, near his 3.72 ERA in that season. 

In the 1943 World Series, Russo limited the St. Louis Cardinals to seven hits in Game 4, and helped himself with the bat, hitting two doubles and scored the winning run in the eighth inning as New York won 2–1.

After the 1943 season, Russo served in the U.S. Army Signal Corps in Hawaii. When he returned two years later, he played for the Yankees again briefly.

Career statistics
In a six-season career, Russo posted a 45–34 record with 311 strikeouts and a 3.13 ERA in 680.2 innings. A solid hitter, he went 50-for-235 for a .213 batting average with 25 RBI and 23 runs. In the post season, Russo compiled a 2–0 record with a 0.50 ERA in two complete games.

Last years
Following his retirement as a player, Russo worked as an expediter for Grumman Aircraft Eng. Corp. in Bethpage, New York. Ending the 1970s, he retired and spent time traveling with his wife, Statia Russo. "We'd take trips to Europe, stay a while in Phoenix and go up to The Berkshires", she said in an interview. The couple moved to Florida in 2001.

Marius Russo died of heart illness in a hospital near his home in Fort Myers, Florida, at 90 years of age.

Sources

External links

Marius Russo Baseball Biography
Newsday

1914 births
2005 deaths
American League All-Stars
American people of Italian descent
Brooklyn Bulldogs baseball players
LIU Brooklyn Blackbirds baseball players
LIU Brooklyn Blackbirds men's basketball players
Major League Baseball pitchers
Baseball players from New York (state)
New York Yankees players
Newark Bears (IL) players
Kansas City Blues (baseball) players
Seattle Rainiers players
Sportspeople from Brooklyn
Baseball players from New York City
American men's basketball players
Brooklyn College alumni
United States Army personnel of World War II